A'ali Al-Furat Sport Club, is an Iraqi football team based in Fallujah, Al-Anbar, that plays in Iraq Division Three.

Managerial history
 Shehan Abid Shehan
 Saadi Awad

See also 
 2020–21 Iraq FA Cup
 2021–22 Iraq FA Cup

References

External links
 A'ali Al-Furat SC on Goalzz.com
 Iraq Clubs- Foundation Dates

2019 establishments in Iraq
Association football clubs established in 2019
Football clubs in Al-Anbar